Ka Likai is a waterfall in the East Khasi Hills district of Meghalaya State, in north-eastern India.  Its river begins in Rangiirteh and passes by the village of Nongriat, though the waterfall can best be seen from the nearby village of Laitkynsew, and the monsoon season in autumn is the most impressive time to view it.  Ka Likai is named for a woman from old-time Rangiirteh by the same name, who threw herself into the falls after discovering that her young child by her first husband, had been killed and dismembered by her second husband and then fed to her by him in a curry. From that time forward the waterfall was called the Fall of Ka Likai.

References

East Khasi Hills district
Waterfalls of Meghalaya